Luis Subercaseaux Errázuriz (10 May 1882–1973) was a Chilean diplomat and athlete.  He is claimed to be the first Chilean and Latin American sportsman to have competed in the Olympic Games, at the 1896 Summer Olympics in Athens.

Biography
Born in Santiago, he was the second son of Ramón Subercaseaux Vicuña and Amalia Errázuriz Urmeneta, both of them members of well-known and well-off families, and the brother of Juan Subercaseaux.

According to the Comité Olímpico de Chile, Luis Subercaseaux Errázuriz competed at the age of 13 in the 100, 400 and 800 metres. Many Olympic historians dispute this claim and maintain that, although he was entered in these events, he did not take part in any race. The International Olympic Committee website lists him as a non-starter in the 100 metres and the 800 metres, and does not list him in the 400 metres.

During this period in his life, he studied at the Colegio Benedictino located in the Basque Provinces of France, where he kept his record on the high jump. He was also one of the founding members of the Chilean football team Club de Deportes Santiago Morning and a successful football player.

Through 1928 he was ambassador of Chile in Peru, Spain and the Vatican, in addition to being an attendant of Chilean business in Belgium, Czechoslovakia, Greece, the Netherlands, Norway, Poland and Yugoslavia from the consular office in London.

A memorial to Subercaseaux stands in the entrance of the Chilean Olympic Museum.

See also
Subercaseaux

References

External links

 
  Excerpt available at HT-ref (i-xvi)
 
 
 

1882 births
1973 deaths
Chilean male sprinters
Sportspeople from Santiago
Olympic athletes of Chile
Athletes (track and field) at the 1896 Summer Olympics
19th-century sportsmen
Ambassadors of Chile to Peru
Ambassadors of Chile to Spain
Ambassadors of Chile to the Holy See
Chilean people of French descent
Subercaseaux family
Date of death missing
Place of death missing